Leonor Fini (30 August 1907 – 18 January 1996) was an Argentinian born Italian surrealist painter, designer, illustrator, and author, known for her depictions of powerful and erotic women.

Early life 
Fini was born in Buenos Aires, Argentina, to Malvina Braun Dubich (born in Trieste, with German, Slavic and Venetian ancestry) and Herminio Fini (with ancestry from Benevento, Italy). Herminio was a handsome and very wealthy man, but also tyrannical, with extreme religious views. He made his young wife very unhappy and, within eighteen month's of Leonor's birth, she fled back to Trieste with the child. Leonor was raised there and she would be expelled from various schools for being rebellious.  As a Catholic, Herminio refused to give Malvina a divorce, which was only granted to her in 1919 through an Italian court. Custody battles often involved Fini and her mother in sudden flights and disguises. In her early teens, an eye disease forced her to wear bandages on both eyes. After recovering, she decided to become an artist.

She moved to Milan at the age of 17, and then to Paris, in either 1931 or 1932. There, she became acquainted with Carlo Carrà and Giorgio de Chirico, who influenced much of her work. She also came to know Paul Éluard, Max Ernst, Georges Bataille, Henri Cartier-Bresson, Picasso, André Pieyre de Mandiargues, and Salvador Dalí. She traveled Europe by car with Mandiargues and Cartier-Bresson where Cartier-Bresson took a photograph, one of his best known, of her naked in a pool with her then partner, de Mandiargues. The photograph of Fini sold in 2007 for $305,000 - the highest price paid at auction for one of Cartier-Bresson's works to that date.

Career 
Fini had no formal artistic training, yet she was familiar with the traditional Renaissance and Mannerist styles encountered during her upbringing in Italy. When she was 17, she had a painting exhibited in a gallery in Trieste and received a commission to paint portraits from dignitaries in Milan, where she had her first one-woman show at the Galerie Barbaroux in 1929.

Her first major exhibition was in 1936 in New York at Julian Levy Gallery. Fini was part of a pre-war generation of Parisian artists, and very important in the Surrealist movement though she is often overlooked in favour of her male contemporaries.  Fini never officially joined the Surrealist movement though she did show her work alongside other Surrealist artists.  In 1943, Fini was included in Peggy Guggenheim's show Exhibition by 31 Women at the Art of This Century gallery in New York.

In 1949 Frederick Ashton choreographed a ballet conceptualized by Fini, Le Rêve de Leonor ("Leonor's Dream") with music by Benjamin Britten. In London, she exhibited at the Kaplan gallery in 1960 and at the Hanover Gallery in 1967.  In the summer of 1986 there was a retrospective at the Musée du Luxembourg in Paris that drew in more than 5,000 people a day. It featured over 260 works in a variety of media. A tribute to the many artistic and creative avenues that her career took throughout her lifetime, the exhibition included watercolours and drawings, theatre/costume designs, paintings and masks. Many of Fini's paintings featured women in positions of power or in very sexualised contexts. An example of this is the painting  La Bout du Monde where a female figure is submerged in water up to her breasts with human and animal skulls surrounding her. Madonna used the imagery in her video, "Bedtime Story" in 1994. In the spring of 1987, Fini had an exhibition at London's Editions Graphique's gallery.

Her work didn't always fit the typical popular conception of surrealism, sometimes exploring the 'femme fatale' without any particularly ambiguous or monstrous imagery. Nonetheless it often included symbols like sphinxes, werewolves, and witches. Most of the characters in her art were female or androgynous. "The terrifying female monster and the adoring girl-child are socially constructed stereotypes continued by the male surrealists. In order to promote the liberated, autonomous woman, Fini purposefully destabilized these stereotypes by combining each construct in a single figure, so that sphinxes can be protective and creative while girls can be sensual and aggressive." Fini was also featured in an exhibition entitled "Women, Surrealism, and Self-representation" at the San Francisco Modern Museum of Art in 1999.

In an attempt to subvert the roles imposed by society, she abandoned representations of fragile, innocent or fatal women in favor of goddesses inspired by Greek mythology. She applied herself to painting female figures who could not be categorized, judged or morally or sexually defined. Her painting has been described both as a challenge to Breton's ideals and an echo of her obligation to disguise herself during her childhood.

She painted portraits of Jean Genet, Anna Magnani, Jacques Audiberti, Alida Valli, Jean Schlumberger (jewelry designer) and Suzanne Flon as well as many other celebrities and wealthy visitors to Paris. While working for Elsa Schiaparelli she designed the bottle for the perfume "Shocking", which became the top selling perfume for the House of Schiaparelli and was the acknowledged inspiration for Jean-Paul Gaultier's later torso-shaped bottles. In 1959, Fini made a fairy tale-inspired painting called Les Sorcières for the Mexican actress, María Félix. Fini started taking on design projects in the 1930s as a source of extra income. 
Between 1944 and 1972, Fini’s main work was involved in costume designs for films and stage productions, and soon became very well known for her fashion sense appearing in magazine gossip columns.  Fini grew an interest in creating hybrid human-animal costumes which she designed for her 1949 ballet Leonors Dream.  She designed costumes and decorations for theatre, ballet and opera, including famously the first ballet performed by Roland Petit's Ballet de Paris, Les Demoiselles de la nuit, featuring a young Margot Fonteyn. She also designed the costumes for two films, Renato Castellani's Romeo and Juliet (1954) and John Huston's A Walk with Love and Death (1968).

Fini also illustrated about 50 books in her life, choosing authors and titles that fit her own interests, including ''Satyricon'' and works by Jean Genet and Charles Baudelaire. Some of her best-known works in this area are her drawings for a 1944 edition of the Marquis de Sade's ''Juliette.'

In the 1970s, she wrote three novels, Rogomelec, Moumour, Contes pour enfants velu and Oneiropompe. Her friends included Jean Cocteau, Giorgio de Chirico, and Alberto Moravia, Fabrizio Clerici and most of the other artists and writers inhabiting or visiting Paris. She illustrated many works by the great authors and poets, including Edgar Allan Poe, Charles Baudelaire and Shakespeare, as well as texts by new writers. Leonor Fini provided illustrations to books by Lise Deharme, the first being Le Poids d’un oiseau in 1955 and Oh! Violette ou la Politesse des Végétaux in 1969. She was very generous with her illustrations and donated many drawings to writers to help them get published. She is, perhaps, best known for her graphic illustrations for the sexually explicit Histoire d'O.

In 2009, Italy dedicated a large exhibition to Fini's work and circle in Trieste. A section of the exhibition was dedicated to her artist friends such as Fabrizio Clerici, Stanislao Lepri, Pavel Tchelitchew, Jan Lebenstein, Michèle Henricot, Dorothea Tanning; a painting by Eros Renzetti, a friend of recent years, concludes this section of the Leonor Fini l'italienne de Paris.

Personal life 
Fini was openly bisexual and had a polyamorous relationship. She told Whitney Chadwick in 1982: "I am a woman, therefore I have had the 'feminine experience', but I am not a lesbian". She also said: "Marriage never appealed to me, I've never lived with one person. Since I was 18, I've always preferred to live in a sort of community – a big house with my atelier and cats and friends, one with a man who was rather a lover and another who was rather a friend. And it has always worked."

Married once, for a brief period, to Federico Veneziani, they were divorced after she met the Italian Count, Stanislao Lepri, who abandoned his diplomatic career shortly after meeting Fini and lived with her thereafter. She met the Polish writer Konstanty Jeleński, known as Kot in Rome in January 1952. Kot joined Fini and Lepri in their Paris apartment in October 1952 and the three remained inseparable until their deaths. She later employed an assistant to join the household, which he described as "a little bit of prison and a lot of theatre". One of his jobs was to look after her beloved Persian cats. Over the years she acquired as many as 23 of them; they shared her bed and were allowed to roam the dining-table at mealtimes. The 'inner circle' expanded to include the American artist,  and the Argentinian poet Juan-Bautista Pinero.

Books in English translation 

Rogomelec (Paris, Stock, 1979). English translation by William Kulik and Serena Shanken Skwersky (Cambridge MA: Wakefield Press, 2020).

Legacy 

A biographical song about Leonor Fini's life, "Leonor", is featured on Welsh artist Katell Keineg's 1997 second album, Jet.

Leonor Fini Catalogue Raisonné of the Oil Paintings by Richard Overstreet and Neil Zukerman. Available in February, 2021 published by Scheidegger & Spiess, Zurich.

In 2018, Fini was the subject of a short documentary, Gloria's Call by Cheri Gaulke.

Retrospectives 

Pourquoi pas?, Bildmuseet, Umeå University, Sweden. January 31, 2014 - May 11, 2014

Filmography
 Leonor Fini, documentary by Chris Vermorcken (1987). Produced by Films Dulac and distributed by RM Associates.

References

Further reading 
 Webb, Peter. Sphinx: The Life and Art of Leonor Fini. New York, Vendome Press. 2009. 
 Zukerman, Neil.  "Leonor Fini - La Vie Idéale". New York, CFM Gallery. 1997. 0-972-8620-2-1
 Zukerman, Neil  "Leonor Fini - Artist as Designer"  New York, CFM Gallery. 1992

External links

 
 Her work at CFM Gallery
 Biography at the Gallery Minsky (and pictures)
 Leonor Fini on Wikiart.org
 Ten Dreams Galleries

1907 births
1996 deaths
20th-century Argentine painters
20th-century Argentine women artists
20th-century Italian women artists
20th-century Argentine artists
Artists from Buenos Aires
Argentine people of Italian descent
Argentine surrealist artists
Italian surrealist artists
Argentine women painters
Italian women painters
Argentine painters
Bisexual painters
Bisexual women
Argentine bisexual people
Italian bisexual people
Argentine LGBT painters
Italian LGBT painters
Women surrealist artists
Polyamorous people
20th-century Argentine LGBT people
20th-century Italian LGBT people
Argentine people of German descent
Argentine people of Slavic descent
Argentine people of Venetian descent